Great masterwort is the common name of several flowering plants of the genus Astrantia, including:

 Astrantia maxima ("largest"), with pinkish-white flowers
 Astrantia major ("larger"), with greenish-white flowers with reddish shades

See also 
 Peucedanum ostruthium or Imperatoria ostruthium, commonly known as masterwort.